Damion O. Crawford (born c. 1980) is a Jamaican politician.

Crawford was born in Haddo, Westmoreland Parish. Crawford attended Kingston College and the University of the West Indies, where he earned bachelor's and master's degrees in tourism management. While completing his master's degree, Crawford served as president of the university's Guild of Students.

Crawford was elected a member of parliament representing Saint Andrew East Rural in December 2011. He concurrently served as Jamaican minister of state for tourism and entertainment. Crawford announced in 2015 that he would not run for reelection to the House of Representatives, but later said that his retirement was a "trick." In October 2015, Crawford lost an indicative election held by the People's National Party to Peter Blake. Blake secured 218 delegate votes, while Crawford finished with 166. Following his loss, Crawford was appointed to the Senate of Jamaica on 23 October 2017, where he served alongside an uncle, Ransford Braham. In September 2018, Crawford, Mikael Phillips, and Phillip Paulwell were named vice presidents of the People's National Party. In February 2019, the People's National Party nominated Crawford to contest a by-election in Portland Eastern. He resigned from the senate in March to focus on his campaign. Crawford lost the Portland Eastern seat to Ann-Marie Vaz, and was reappointed to the senate.

References

1980s births
Living people
People from Westmoreland Parish
People's National Party (Jamaica) politicians
Members of the House of Representatives of Jamaica
Members of the Senate of Jamaica
Government ministers of Jamaica
University of the West Indies alumni